The Internet in Switzerland has one of the highest penetration rates in Europe.

Summary

 Internet users: 6.8 million, 49th in the world; 85.2% of the population, 19th in the world (2012).
 Fixed broadband: 3.3 million subscribers, 27th in the world; 41.9% of population, 3rd in the world (2012). 	
 Mobile broadband: 3.3 million subscribers, 49th in the world; 41.4% of population, 39th in the world (2012).
 Internet hosts: 5.3 million, 20th in the world (2012).
 Top level domain: .ch
 IPv4 addresses: 20.9 million, 0.5% of worldwide total, 2.726 addresses per person (2012).

Broadband

Switzerland has one of the fastest broadband penetration rates in Europe. Broadband access using dial-up telephone communications as the main growth area, and DSL networks have overtaken cable Internet access as the principal technology for broadband access. Strong growth in mobile broadband has added to the mix.

Approximately two thirds of home broadband subscriptions are via DSL, specifically ADSL and VDSL, with the remaining third using cable. Many DSL providers sell "naked DSL", which is cheaper, but comes without telephone service. Other xDSL technologies, satellite access, and optical fiber are available, but are generally used by businesses due to their cost. Fiber connections for private customers are available in some urban areas.

Fixed broadband providers

Cablecom, the largest cable ISP, supplies digital broadband Internet access, telephone and TV. No Swisscom line is needed for Cablecom services. There is a subscription fee for the cable line, which is often included in the rent of an apartment. The cable subscription includes "free Internet" (2MBit/sec) for a setup fee of 100CHF. A comprehensive website in English explains all products.
DFI is the main Internet supplier in Geneva.
Green provides ADSL, VDSL and SDSL Internet connections. Website in French, German and English.
M-Budget DSL provides DSL, fixed lines and mobile phones. Web site in French, German and Italian.
Monzoon offers prepaid VDSL and ADSL lines.
Sunrise provides fixed lines, mobile phones and various ADSL and VDSL packages. Website in French, German, Italian and English.
Swisscom Internet service. Website in French, German, Italian and English.
InterXS Internet and Telephony services. Website in German, French and English. Provides VDSL, ADSL and Fiber internet with fixed line included. Pay as you Go packages without long term contract now available.
Init7 1/10/25Gbps FTTH internet service, VDSL and ADSL. Website in German, French and English.

Speeds and price comparison

 Swisscom DSL residential plans: 5 Mbit/s (74CHF/month), 15 Mbit/s (79CHF/month), 40 Mbit/s (99CHF/month), 100Mbit/s (109/month), 300Mbit/s (139CHF/month). Needs a telephone line which costs 25.35CHF/month.
 Cablecom Cable: Residential Plans : 40 Mbit/s (59CHF/month), 100 Mbit/s (99CHF/month), 250 Mbit/s (109CHF/month), 500 Mbit/s (129CHF/month). One time activation fee 99CHF. Needs a cable subscription which costs 28.40CHF / month (often part of the rent)  as of 2017, cable charges are now bundled with the package.
 Green: 0.4 Mbit/s (49CHF), 10 Mbit/s (59CHF), 50 Mbit/s (69CHF), 100 Mbit/s (74CHF). The required telephone line is included, but does not include voice telephone service.
 InterXS: 2 Mbit/s (22,50CHF), 20 Mbit/s (29,50CHF), 50 Mbit/s (32,45CHF), 100 Mbit/s (32,50CHF), 1000 Mbit/s (39,50CHF). The required telephone line is included, and does include voice telephone service.

Mobile broadband providers
There are three Swiss mobile network providers, each using its own mobile network:

 Swisscom Mobile
 Sunrise
 Salt (Orange)

There are numerous types of mobile telephone subscriptions. Subscriptions are for 12 or 24 months, depending on the offer. Several providers have ended the practice of automatic renewal upon expiry and more will do so in 2014.

There are also prepaid offers available, which do not require a subscription. After buying the prepaid card, calls can be made immediately. Some providers have facilities for recharging a card at train ticket dispensing machines, post office machines, or in some electronics shops. Prepaid cards are sold in many shops and kiosks.

Internet censorship and surveillance

References